This is a list of seasons by the Alaska Aces of the Philippine Basketball Association.

Three-conference era

Two-conference era
*one-game playoffs**team had twice-to-beat advantage

Three-conference era
* One-game Playoffs** Team had the Twice-to-Beat Advantage

Cumulative records